Tom Persich (born 25 September 1971) is a German former professional footballer who played as a defender.

Career
Persich made his debut on the professional league level in the 2. Bundesliga for Hallescher FC on 17 May 1992 when he started in a game against FC Rot-Weiß Erfurt. He also played in the UEFA Cup for Hallescher FC. He played a total of 323 games for 1. FC Union Berlin.

Honours
 DFB-Pokal finalist: 2000–01

References

1971 births
Living people
Association football defenders
German footballers
Hallescher FC players
1. FC Union Berlin players
SV Babelsberg 03 players
SV Germania Schöneiche players
2. Bundesliga players
People from Weißenfels
Footballers from Saxony-Anhalt
East German footballers
People from Bezirk Halle